Kietlanka is a hamlet in the Masovian Voivodeship, Poland located in the Gmina Korytnica, Węgrów County.

References 

Villages in Węgrów County